Warsaw is an incorporated Town in and the County Seat of Richmond County, Virginia, United States.  The population was 1,637 at the 2020 census and is estimated to be 2,281 as of 2022.

History
The original name of the Town was Richmond Courthouse. In 1831 the Town's name was changed to Warsaw, after the news of the bloody Battle of Warsaw reached local residents. A number of other small towns in the United States changed their names to Warsaw at this time (Warsaw, Kentucky for instance), all as a result of sympathy in the United States for the November Uprising in Poland. Because Richmond Courthouse was still unincorporated in 1830, it is unclear who was responsible for the change of name to Warsaw. Historic sites nearby include Menokin, the former home of Francis Lightfoot Lee, Mount Airy and Sabine Hall. A former plantation estate Belle Mount is currently operated as a vineyard and winery within a few miles of Warsaw town limits.

In addition to Menokin, Mount Airy, and Sabine Hall, Grove Mount and the Richmond County Courthouse are listed on the National Register of Historic Places.  The formerly listed Bladensfield was destroyed by fire in 1996.

Geography
Warsaw is located at  (37.957617, −76.758302).

According to the United States Census Bureau, the town has a total area of 3.0 square miles (7.9 km2), all of it land.

Climate
The climate in this area is characterized by hot, humid summers and generally mild to cool winters.  According to the Köppen Climate Classification system, Warsaw has a humid subtropical climate, abbreviated "Cfa" on climate maps.

Demographics

As of the census of 2000, there were 1,375 people, 445 households, and 233 families living in the town. The population density was 453.0 people per square mile (174.6/km2). There were 468 housing units at an average density of 154.2 per square mile (59.4/km2). The racial makeup of the town was 67.64% White, 29.38% African American, 0.22% Native American, 0.44% Asian, 1.53% from other races, and 0.80% from two or more races. Hispanic or Latino of any race were 4.36% of the population.

There were 445 households, out of which 22.5% had children under the age of 18 living with them, 39.1% were married couples living together, 10.8% had a female householder with no husband present, and 47.6% were non-families. 45.6% of all households were made up of individuals, and 24.3% had someone living alone who was 65 years of age or older. The average household size was 2.01 and the average family size was 2.81.

In the town, the population was spread out, with 13.3% under the age of 18, 9.7% from 18 to 24, 28.1% from 25 to 44, 19.4% from 45 to 64, and 29.5% who were 65 years of age or older. The median age was 44 years. For every 100 females, there were 102.2 males. For every 100 females age 18 and over, there were 103.8 males.

The median income for a household in the town was $28,971, and the median income for a family was $44,167. Males had a median income of $40,052 versus $23,661 for females. The per capita income for the town was $21,392. About 12.4% of families and 16.8% of the population were below the poverty line, including 20.6% of those under age 18 and 16.4% of those age 65 or over.

Economy
Warsaw serves as the economic hub of Richmond County and provides a wide array of employment opportunities. Warsaw is also the location for the Northern Neck Regional Jail which was completed in 1995. The jail employs 100 people and has a capacity of 460 inmates with its most recent addition completed in 2000.

Notable people
 William Atkinson Jones – member of United States House of Representatives, sometimes called architect of Philippine independence
 Cal Bowdler – power forward for NBA's Atlanta Hawks (1999–2002)
 Tom Robbins - Author who recounted their childhood of living in Warsaw in their autobiography Tibetan Peach Pie

 Jim Coates - pitched for the New York Yankees 1956. 1959–1962.

References

External links

 Town of Warsaw website

Towns in Richmond County, Virginia
County seats in Virginia
Towns in Virginia